The Scions of Shannara is a fantasy novel by American writer Terry Brooks. It is the first book in the Heritage of Shannara series, which takes place three hundred years after the end of the previous Shannara trilogy. The first version was published in 1990. The book follows the lives of the Scions of Shannara, Par Ohmsford, Walker Boh, and Wren (Ohmsford).

Plot summary

The Scions of Shannara is set in a land ruled by the cruel military order called the Federation. The Elves have vanished, while the dwarves are imprisoned for having fought the Federation in the past. The Dwarves are sent to dig in mines, and will soon be extinct because of the Federation's wickedness. Magic is forbidden.

Par Ohmsford and his brother Coll start the story in Varfleet, telling legends and important histories of the past about the adventures of the Ohmsfords and the druids in a tavern through the use of Par's magic, the wishsong. The wishsong is but an illusion seen when Par sings what he wants to create. However, what Par and Coll are doing is illegal under the law of the Federation because magic is supposedly the cause for various problems that are occurring in the Four Lands. On one night, Rimmer Dall, first Seeker for the Federation, bursts into the tavern, having found out about Par and Coll, and tries to arrest them. Par and Coll are rescued by a mysterious man, who claims to be a leader of the rebel group (or the Movement). The man does not give them his name, though he does hand Par a ring with a hawk insignia. He tells them that when they need help they can go to a certain forge, show the ring, and they will be led to the Movement's base. Thus, the two brothers escape and after much debate decide to travel to Leah to meet up with their friend, Morgan Leah. Upon their way, they are attacked by a frightening woods hag who is a Shadowen, a beast of legend and of great power. Yet they are saved by an old man, Cogline, who was once a Druid, and is now a messenger for the Shade of Allanon. He informs them that they must travel to the Hadeshorn in order to meet with the ancient Druid, Allanon. The fate of the Four Lands lies upon them and the other scions of Shannara: Wren in the Westland and Walker Boh who lives somewhere in the Eastland, and to whom Cogline is to deliver the message also. The Shadowen threaten to overcome all the Races.

The two brothers, and later Walker Boh and Wren, travel to the Hadeshorn through much peril. All the scions meet at the Valley of Shale and receive tasks from the shade of Allanon. Wren is charged to return the missing Elves, Walker is charged with returning Paranor and the Druids, and Par is charged with finding the lost Sword of Shannara. Both Wren and Walker see their charges as impossible (Walker even goes as far to say that he would rather lose his hand than recover lost Paranor and restore the druid order) and leave, but Par is determined to fulfill his task.

Par heads to the forge, hoping that the Movement will know more of the Four Land in order to find the Sword. He comes to the city of Varfleet with his companions, Morgan Leah, Coll Ohmsford, Steff, and Teel to request for help from an outlaw ally. Upon reaching their meeting point, however, they are pursued by Federation. Hirehone, one of the outlaws, hides them in an underground basement before taking them to the Parma Key, base of the Movement. The company meets the mysterious leader who then tells them that he is Padishar Creel. He says he knows where the Sword is, leaving the Dwarves behind, Creel, Morgan, Coll, a group of outlaws, and Par set out for Tyrsis, the last known place of the Sword of Shannara. Once in Tyrsis, Creel leads them to a hiding place. Padishar Creel goes out to show Par about the truth. They meet with a girl, Damson Rhee. The three of them go for a walk and Creel explains that the Bridge of Sendric and People's Park in Tyrsis where the Sword was said to be placed many years before were destroyed. The ancient Bridge and Park were covered up in the Pit, a place guarded and unseen, and that fake ones were built in their place. They devise a plan so that Morgan, Par, Coll, Padishar, and some of the other outlaws venture into the Pit, where the Sword of Shannara was last seen.
 
Then at night, the group go into out to the pit. They lower a ladder into the Pit, but unfortunately the Federation guards see them. The rebels and Par, Coll, and Morgan are captured and are told that one of the outlaws had betrayed them. Par uses the Wishsong to distract the guards so he could escape. He meets with Damson, and together they make a plan to free their companions. They do just that, and after hiding in another place, they make a plan to go into the Pit again. The second time the company, excluding Damson, makes it to the bottom of the Pit safely. There Par finds out that he can use another kind of magic that can find things that he wants, and he sees through this that the Sword is indeed there. However, they are confronted by Shadowen. Creel and Morgan make a stand in order for Par and Coll to escape. Par and Coll flee and are hidden by Damson, thinking that their friends are dead. Par insists on them to venture into the Pit a last time, and Damson knows a creature that might know another way into it. She leads them to the Mole, who agrees to help them, and escorts them through a series of tunnels and into the Pit. Damson and the Mole stay outside, while Par and Coll go in. This time Par does find the Vault, where the Sword is placed, and goes in, leaving Coll to stand guard outside (Coll wanted to). Par finds the Sword, and meets Rimmer Dall there, who shows him that he is a Shadowen and asks Par to join him. Par does not agree, and Rimmer Dall leaves, saying that once Par comes out of the Vault something precious will be lost. Par takes the Sword and runs out of the Vault to find that while he was gone Coll was possessed by Shadowen and that his brother has become one himself. Par kills him to escape and runs away from the Pit. He finds Damson and they hide in the tunnels that The Mole live in. Par, depressed and confused, becomes sick and Damson slowly but surely nurtures him back to health before vowing to get revenge for what happened to his brother.

Meanwhile, Padishar and Morgan are actually not dead, and have fled from the city of Tyrsis, having survived using Morgan's magical Sword of Leah. But the Sword of Leah is broken in the act of breaking free from the Pit and Morgan turns ill because of this. The two of them run to Parma Key, and are closely pursued by an army of the Federation who want to put an end to the Movement once and for all, having found out the base of the rebels from a traitor. The companions come to Parma Key and prepare to battle away the Federation with the Movement. A long battle takes place, in which Morgan finds out who the traitor is - it being Teel the Dwarf, who is now a Shadowen, who is on her way to opening a passageway into Parma Key for the Federation to breach. Creel and Morgan fight her, and both are wounded in the act, while Steff, her lover, is killed by Teel. However, the passageway was opened, since they were too late, and so Morgan and Creel head back. The Movement then escapes using another secret tunnel and are free for the time. The battle ends thus, with the escape of the Movement.

Walker Boh believes it is impossible for him to recover lost Paranor and the Druids, until Cogline brings him an old Druid History. Then Walker learns that he must first find the Black Elfstone from the Hall of Kings and with it accomplish his task. He goes to the Hall of Kings, which is an ancient place of great evil. There he goes and upon coming there goes to the location of the Black Elfstone. Using the magic he had mastered, he senses where the black elfstone is. He goes to where he feels something and there he encounters an Asphinx, a snake that turns everything it poisons to stone before becoming rock itself, instead of the black elfstone. The Asphinx bites him and Walker finds that his hand has turned to stone, effectively trapping him. Walker also knows that he is doomed because the poison of the Asphinx will spread until he has been completely turned to stone.

Characters 

Par Ohmsford
Coll Ohmsford
Walker Boh
Wren Elessedil
Garth
Cogline
Steff
Teel
Padishar Creel
Damson Rhee
Rimmer Dall
Morgan Leah

Popular culture

Michael Burry named his hedge fund company, Scion Capital, after the book.

External links
 The Official Terry Brooks Website

Shannara novels
1990 American novels
1990 fantasy novels
High fantasy novels
Del Rey books